The Premier Volleyball League teams are all the teams that have participated in the Premier Volleyball League in the Philippines since the 2017 season. The league was formerly known as the Shakey's V-League prior to 2017.

Women's division

Corporate

(*) on leave of absence

Collegiate (2017–2019)

Men's division (2017–2018)

Corporate

Collegiate

References

Teams
Volleyball clubs in the Philippines